The Democratic Republic of the Congo competed in the 2008 Summer Olympics which were held in Beijing, People's Republic of China from August 8 to August 24, 2008. The country's delegation consisted of 29 people, including coaches and sports officials. Athletes from the DRC competed in athletics, judo, boxing and swimming.

Athletics

Men

Women

Key
Note–Ranks given for track events are within the athlete's heat only
Q = Qualified for the next round
q = Qualified for the next round as a fastest loser or, in field events, by position without achieving the qualifying target
NR = National record
N/A = Round not applicable for the event
Bye = Athlete not required to compete in round

Boxing

DR Congo qualified one boxer for the Olympic boxing tournament. Herry Saliku Biembe qualified in the middleweight class at the second African qualifying tournament.

Judo

Swimming

Men

References

External links
 

Nations at the 2008 Summer Olympics
2008
Summer Olympics